was a train station located on the Kurihara Den'en Railway Company Kurihara Den'en Railway Line in Kurihara, Miyagi Prefecture, Japan.

Line
Kurihara Den'en Railway Company, Kurihara Den'en Railway Line

Surrounding area
Hosokura_mine

History
1 December 1942: Station begins operation as Hosokura Station.
16 June 1990: Station name is changed to Hosokura Mine Park Mae Station
1 April 2007: Station ends operation.

Adjacent stations

Railway stations in Miyagi Prefecture
Kurihara Den'en Railway Line
Defunct railway stations in Japan
Railway stations in Japan opened in 1942
Railway stations closed in 2007